Robert Mimpriss (1797–1875) was an English Sunday school worker notable for his biblical and Christian writings.

Biography 

He was born in Deptford, Kent on 14 January 1797.

He died in Clapham on 20 December 1875.

Legacy 

He is today chiefly remembered for his contribution to the development of Sunday schools. He presented Christian gospels as a continuous narrative and made it easier to be taught in schools.

Bibliography 

His notable books include:

 The Gospel treasury, and expository harmony of the four evangelists
 A harmony of the four Gospels, in the English authorized version, arranged according to Greswell's "Harmonia evangelica" in Greek
 The Teacher's Manual Acts of the Apostles.
 Studies on the Gospels in Harmony
 The life of Christ harmonized from the four Evangelists 
 Christ an example for the young : exhibited in the gospel narrative of the four evangelists 
 The steps of Jesus: a narrative harmony of the four Evangelists

References

External links 

British historians
1797 births
1875 deaths